Superfantagenio (also known as Aladdin) is a 1986 Italian/American family comedy film starring Bud Spencer as the Genie and Luca Venantini as Aladdin, and with Spencer's daughter Diamy participating in a secondary role as Aladdin's love interest.

Plot
The story revolves around a teenage boy named Al Haddin, nicknamed "Aladdin", who is living with his widowed mother Janet and his alcoholic grandfather Jeremiah in Miami, Florida. He and his family live in poverty since his father's untimely demise; his mother slaves away in the nightclub of Monty Siracusa, a local mobster boss who runs a citywide protection racket. Jeremiah aggravates this situation by blowing the little money Janet makes on alcohol and horse races. Al has to work part-time in an antique shop to support his family as best he can.

One day, Al's boss brings an old lamp, which a fisherman acquaintance of his has just salvaged from the ocean, to the store and orders Al to polish it. As Al rubs on the lamp, a genie - the very one from Aladdin's tale - suddenly appears before him and proclaims him his new master. After recovering from his first shock, Al begins to use the genie's power to fulfill some of his most eager wishes: beating up a bully and his gang, winning the affection of Patricia, his long-time crush, and riding in a real Rolls-Royce, something his late father had always dreamed of. More importantly, Al begins to view the Genie as a friend and asks him only for his most fondest wishes without overindulging himself.

The presence of the Genie and his powers, however, gradually begin to draw unwanted attention. Patricia's father, Police Sergeant O'Connor, takes an unwelcome interest in the brand-new Rolls-Royce cars Al suddenly gets out of nowhere; the Genie interferes with Siracusa's illicit business, which frustrates the mobster to no end, and is arrested twice for driving without a license, which earns him two temporary stints in prison (although he escapes once Al summons him again). In addition, his powers only work during the day, as they have to regenerate overnight, which proves a bit problematic at times, such as when Al is kidnapped by a band of child snatchers and has to wait come morning before the Genie can overcome the gangsters. In due time, the Chief of the Police learns of the Genie's mysterious abilities and orders his superintendent to bring the Genie to him.

Eventually, Siracusa abducts Janet and Jeremiah and begins to brutally question them about the Genie. Although it is night when Al summons him, the Genie's physical strength proves more than enough to finish Siracusa's gang by himself, and the gangsters are arrested. Under a false pretense, the Genie is taken away to be dissected, but Al, fearing the worst, finds him before this deed can be executed and manages to convince the Police Chief that he is not an alien but a real-life genie. The Chief then asks Al to have the Genie disable the entire world's military arsenal - all except of his own private army, so that he can seize control over the world. The Genie, however, refuses to fulfill this wish, as it would seriously upset the balance of power, and he and Al make their escape on the Chief's office carpet converted into a flying carpet.

The pair proceeds to the Bermuda Triangle, where the Genie prepares to sink the lamp into the depths of the sea to prevent his powers from being abused. Al, however, unwilling to let his friend go, asks for one final wish, which is fulfilled. With the reward money from Siracusa's capture, the Haddins buy the nightclub and celebrate its reopening, with the Genie staying with them as a normal human being.

Cast
Bud Spencer as The Genie
Luca Venantini as Al Haddin
Janet Agren as Janet Haddin
Umberto Raho as the Police Chief
Raffaele Mottola as the Police Superintendent
Julian Voloshin as Jeremiah, Al's grandpa
Diamy Spencer as Patricia O'Connor
Tony Adams as Monty Siracusa

References

External links

1986 films
1980s fantasy comedy films
American fantasy comedy films
Italian fantasy comedy films
1980s Italian-language films
English-language Italian films
1980s English-language films
Films directed by Bruno Corbucci
Films scored by Fabio Frizzi
Films set in the Bermuda Triangle
Films set in Miami
Genies in film
Golan-Globus films
1986 multilingual films
American multilingual films
Italian multilingual films
Films produced by Menahem Golan
Films based on Aladdin
Films produced by Yoram Globus
1980s American films
1980s Italian films